HMS Pembroke was a 50-gun fourth rate ship of the line of the Royal Navy, built at Plymouth Dockyard to the 1706 Establishment, and launched on 18 May 1710.

Pembroke served until 1726, when she was broken up.

Notes

References

Lavery, Brian (2003) The Ship of the Line - Volume 1: The development of the battlefleet 1650-1850. Conway Maritime Press. .

Ships of the line of the Royal Navy
1710s ships